Orgasm is an album by jazz hornist Alan Shorter recorded in 1968 and released on the Verve label.

Reception

AllMusic rated the album 4½ stars and its review by Scott Yanow states, "Shorter, although not a virtuoso, comes up with consistently inventive ideas. The style is sometimes slightly reminiscent of Ornette Coleman (partly due to the presence of Haden), but Shorter had apparently not heard Ornette's band before recording this music. Well worth several listens".

Track listing
All compositions by Alan Shorter
 "Parabola"- 13:07
 "Joseph" - 3:07
 "Straits of Blagellan" - 7:27
 "Rapids" - 9:30
 "Outeroids"- 4:15
 "Orgasm" - 11:20

Personnel
Alan Shorter - flugelhorn
Gato Barbieri - tenor saxophone
Charlie Haden (tracks 1 & 6) Reggie Johnson (tracks 3 & 4) - bass
Muhammad Ali (tracks 1 & 6), Rashied Ali (tracks 2-5) - drums

References 

1969 albums
Alan Shorter albums
Verve Records albums
Albums produced by Esmond Edwards